Atholus is a genus of clown beetles in the family Histeridae. There are more than 70 described species in Atholus.

Species
These 78 species belong to the genus Atholus:

 Atholus aequistrius (Marseul, 1854)
 Atholus americanus (Paykull, 1811)
 Atholus amplificipes Mazur, 2013
 Atholus arcatus (Lewis, 1908)
 Atholus arrowi (Desbordes, 1923)
 Atholus astragali Olexa, 1987
 Atholus atricolor Lewis, 1907
 Atholus baberii (Lewis, 1901)
 Atholus bakeri (Bickhardt, 1914)
 Atholus bifrons (Marseul, 1854)
 Atholus bimaculatus (Linnaeus, 1758)
 Atholus bolteri Wenzel, 1944
 Atholus brancuccii Mazur, 2013
 Atholus cinctipygus (Lewis, 1900)
 Atholus cochinchinae (Schmidt, 1889)
 Atholus coelestis (Marseul, 1857)
 Atholus concordans (Marseul, 1870)
 Atholus confinis (Erichson, 1834)
 Atholus conformis (Erichson, 1834)
 Atholus corvinus (Germar, 1817)
 Atholus crenatifrons (Lewis, 1899)
 Atholus cycloides (Burgeon, 1939)
 Atholus daldorffi (Bedel, 1906)
 Atholus debeauxi (Moro, 1942)
 Atholus dentipes (Lewis, 1892)
 Atholus depistor (Marseul, 1873)
 Atholus duodecimstriatus (Schrank, 1781)
 Atholus erichsoni Lundgren in Johnson et al., 1991
 Atholus euphorbiae (Peyerimhoff, 1925)
 Atholus falli (Bickhardt, 1912)
 Atholus famulus (Lewis, 1892)
 Atholus gestroi (Schmidt, 1897)
 Atholus goudotii (Marseul, 1854)
 Atholus graueri (G. Müller, 1944)
 Atholus helferi (Reichardt, 1932)
 Atholus holzschuhi Olexa, 1988
 Atholus hucheti Gomy, 2004
 Atholus infirmus (Schmidt, 1889)
 Atholus khnzoriani Olexa, 1982
 Atholus kuijteni Kanaar, 1983
 Atholus laequatus (Lewis, 1905)
 Atholus lao Mazur, 2013
 Atholus levis Mazur, 2013
 Atholus maindronii (Lewis, 1901)
 Atholus malaysi Lewis, 1908
 Atholus minutus Ross, 1940
 Atholus myrmidon (Marseul, 1861)
 Atholus nitidissimus Desbordes, 1925
 Atholus nubilus (J. L. LeConte, 1859)
 Atholus omar (Lewis, 1913)
 Atholus paganettii (Bickhardt, 1911)
 Atholus peloponnesus Kapler, 1992
 Atholus perplexus (J. L. LeConte, 1863)
 Atholus philippinensis (Marseul, 1854)
 Atholus pinnulae (Lewis, 1900)
 Atholus pirithous (Marseul, 1873)
 Atholus praetermissus (Peyron, 1856)
 Atholus relictus (Marseul, 1870)
 Atholus rubricatus (Lewis, 1897)
 Atholus rudesculptus (Reichardt, 1922)
 Atholus scutellaris (Erichson, 1834)
 Atholus sedecimstriatus (Say, 1825)
 Atholus sessilis (Lewis, 1899)
 Atholus siculus (Tournier, 1869)
 Atholus silvicola (Lewis, 1901)
 Atholus singalanus (Marseul, 1880)
 Atholus somali (Lewis, 1885)
 Atholus staudingeri (Schmidt, 1889)
 Atholus striatipennis (Lewis, 1892)
 Atholus striatithorax Desbordes, 1930
 Atholus tenuistriatus (Lewis, 1889)
 Atholus terraemotus (Lewis, 1900)
 Atholus tetricus (Lewis, 1902)
 Atholus tornatus (J. L. LeConte, 1880)
 Atholus torquatus (Marseul, 1854)
 Atholus vacillans (Lewis, 1900)
 Atholus viennai Secq, 2000
 Atholus yelamosi Gomy, 2011

References

Further reading

External links

 

Histeridae
Articles created by Qbugbot